Super Contra, known as  in Japan and Probotector II: Return of the Evil Forces in Europe, is a run and gun video game by Konami, originally released as a coin-operated arcade video game in December 1987. It is the sequel to the original Contra and part of the Contra series. The game stars Bill Rizer and Lance Bean as they are sent to thwart another alien invasion from the vicious Red Falcon.

It was ported to the Nintendo Entertainment System under the shortened title of Super C in North America and as Probotector II: Return of the Evil Forces in Europe. Both the arcade version and the NES version have been re-released for various other platforms since their original releases.

Plot
A year after the battle with the Red Falcon Organization, Bill and Lance are sent on another mission. This time, the alien forces have taken over an allied military base, possessing most of its troops. Bill and Lance must not only fight against their former comrades-in-arms, but also a new mutated form of the same alien creatures they fought during their previous mission.

Gameplay

Like in the original Contra, the game can be played by up to two players simultaneously. The left player controls Bill (who wears green in this installment), while the right player controls Lance (who wears purple). The game retains the side-scrolling format from the previous game, discarding only the pseudo-3D and fixed screen segments. Instead, Super Contra features vertically-scrolling stages played from an overhead perspective, in which the player can move in eight directions. The controls remain mostly the same during the side-scrolling segments, with the only difference is that the player can now control the height of their jump by holding the joystick upwards or downwards while pressing the jump button.

The player can replace their default gun with one of four possible weapons by destroying the flying item capsules that appear throughout each stage. The available weapons include a machine gun, a spread gun, a bomb gun and a laser gun. This time, weapons can be upgraded by picking up the same power-up twice in a row, resulting in greater destructive power. The power-ups in Super Contra are represented by the actual guns the player's character wields instead of the Falcon-shaped letter icons from the previous game. During overhead stages, the player can also pick up a "hyper shell" item that destroys all on-screen enemies, which can be launched at any time during these stages by pressing the jump button. The player can store more than one hyper shell at a time and the count is carried over between overhead stages.

The game consists of five stages, which are set in a military base, a jungle and the alien's lair. Stages 1, 3 and 4 are played from the standard side-scrolling perspective, while Stages 2 and 5 employ the top-down perspective. Throughout each stage, the player must fight their way through the enemy's line of defense (including a few mid-bosses) until they reach the final target waiting at the end.

After running out of lives, the player is not allowed to continue up to five times before the game is entirely over; this depends on the DIP switch settings. Unlike the predecessor, each player can now continue at any time, with no need to wait until the other player runs out of lives.

Version differences
Two versions of the Super Contra arcade game were produced: an English version (which was distributed not just in North America, but also in Europe, where the game retained its original title, in contrast to the Gryzor variant of the first arcade game) and a Japanese version. The two versions of the game are almost identical aside from the language of the text shown during the intro sequence. However, the English version ends the game after the player has cleared the final stage, whereas the Japanese version restarts the game from the first stage after the end credits are shown. On the second loop, the player's score, lives and weapons (including hyper shells) will be carried over from the previous playthrough and the game's difficulty will be set to its highest level (regardless of the machine's actual setting), but the continuation feature will cease to be available. This means the game will be completely over when the player completes the final stage again or runs out of lives.

Ports

Nintendo Entertainment System
A home version of Super Contra was released for the Nintendo Entertainment System on February 2, 1990, in Japan and in April 1990 in North America, where it was retitled Super C. A PAL version of the NES game, titled Probotector II: Return of the Evil Forces, was released in 1992.

The gameplay and graphics of Super C are similar to the port of the first Contra game. There are three stages unique to the NES version: a high-tech base, a mountain and an alien nest, all vertically-scrolling stages. The order of the latter stages and bosses are also slightly different, with new bosses featured in this version (including a new final boss). The NES version uses the same power-ups as the original NES game, but changes the function of the "fire ball" power-up from a gun that fires small fireballs that travel in a corkscrew pattern to a large projectile that spreads fire after hitting its target. The player can charge this gun by holding down the B button and then releasing it, shooting an even larger projectile that passes through most fodder enemies and causes an even bigger explosion (with 8 sparks) when it hits a large target. The Rapid Bullets, Barrier and Special power-ups from the first NES game are also included in this game.

The Konami Code from the original Contra was not included in this game. A different code was added which gives out thirty lives in the Famicom version and ten lives in the NES versions. Like in the Famicom version of Contra, the Japanese Super Contra has a stage select code that was removed from its NES counterparts. All three versions contain a sound test mode. Like the first NES game, Probotector II (the PAL version), replaced the main characters and some of the enemies with robots.

The original arcade soundtrack was rearranged for the Japanese and North American versions by Hidenori Maezawa. Because the soundtrack used DPCM samples of orchestra hits, Yuichi Sakakura altered the sound driver for Probotector II to avoid playing the samples out of tune (a common occurrence in previous NTSC-to-PAL conversions).

Other platforms 
A pair of computer versions of Super C developed by Distinctive Software were released in North America for the Commodore Amiga and IBM PC by Konami in 1990. Despite bearing the NES version's title of Super C, the computer ports are based on the original arcade game.

A direct emulation of the arcade Super Contra was released on Xbox Live Arcade for the Xbox 360 on July 25, 2007, and features enhanced graphics, remixed music and cooperative gameplay via Xbox Live. The arcade version was rereleased on June 12, 2019 on the Contra Anniversary Collection for the PlayStation 4, Xbox One, PC Steam and Nintendo Switch.

The NES version also saw several rereleases. The 2002 Windows PC compilation Konami Collectors' Series: Castlevania and Contra features Super C along with the NES version of the original game, as well as the first three Castlevania games for the system. Super C was later released as a Virtual Console title in North America in 2007. A corresponding release for Probotector 2: Return of the Evil Forces was made for the European and Australian Virtual Console. The Famicom Super Contra was released for the Japanese Virtual Console on February 12, 2008. Both the NES versions of Contra and Super C are also included as unlockable bonuses in the Nintendo DS game Contra 4, also released in 2007. The NES version of Super C is also released on the Virtual Console for 3DS and Wii U as well as the NES Classic Edition compilation; released in 2013, 2014 and 2016, respectively. Like its arcade counterpart, the NES game is included on the Contra Anniversary Collection compilation from 2019.

A mobile phone version of Super Contra was released in Japan and China (Super Contra 2) on March 5, 2008, coinciding with the release of Contra: Dual Spirits (the Japanese localization of Contra 4). This version features the stages from the NES version, but with graphics similar to the arcade game (including the opening intro).

Reception

In Japan, Game Machine listed Super Contra on their March 1, 1988 issue as being the fourth most-successful table arcade unit of the month.

Super Contra received positive reviews. Allgame editor Aaron Kosydar described Super C as "an excellent game that a lot of hardcore gamers will never forget". Japanese game magazine Famitsu gave the Famicom (NES) version of the game a score of 25 out of 40.

In 1997 Electronic Gaming Monthly listed it as the 9th best arcade game of all time.

Notes

References

External links

1987 video games
1988 video games
Arcade video games
Contra (series)
Nintendo Entertainment System games
PlayChoice-10 games
DOS games
Run and gun games
Video game sequels
Video games set in the 27th century
Virtual Console games
Virtual Console games for Wii U
Xbox 360 Live Arcade games
Windows games
Multiplayer and single-player video games
Cooperative video games
Video games with isometric graphics
Konami games
Konami arcade games
Video games developed in Japan
Distinctive Software games